Jagdishpura is a locality in Khurai City of Madhya Pradesh

Etymology
The name 'Jagdishpura' is derived from "Jagdish" meaning God and "Pura" meaning "land," hence its name means "Land of God"

Places of interest
Jagdishpura is famous for Dargah, a cemetery house of "Pir Baba" which is often visited by every Hindu, Muslim and Sikh community.

An annual "Urs" (Religious Fare for all communities) is also held here in the months of May & June.

Transport and communication
The locality of Jagdishpura is just 4 km from the city centre and can be reached by private vehicles. 

Khurai